Rune Andres Alvarado (born May 15, 1997) is a United States Virgin Islands international footballer.

Personal life
Born in the United States, Alvarado is also of Ecuadorian descent.

Career statistics

Club

Notes

International

References

External links
 Rune Alvarado at CaribbeanFootballDatabase

1997 births
Living people
Sportspeople from Boca Raton, Florida
Soccer players from Florida
United States Virgin Islands soccer players
American soccer players
Ecuadorian footballers
Association football defenders
Association football midfielders
United States Virgin Islands international soccer players
United States Virgin Islands expatriate soccer players
American expatriate sportspeople in Spain
Expatriate footballers in Spain